

This is a list of the National Register of Historic Places listings in New London County, Connecticut.

This is intended to be a complete list of the properties and districts on the National Register of Historic Places in New London County, Connecticut, United States. The locations of National Register properties and districts for which the latitude and longitude coordinates are included below, may be seen in an online map.

There are 203 properties and districts listed on the National Register in the county, including 13 National Historic Landmarks.  One property was once listed, but has since been delisted.

Current listings

|}

Former listing

|}

See also

List of National Historic Landmarks in Connecticut
National Register of Historic Places listings in Connecticut

References

 
 
New London